Irvine Park is a city park located in Chippewa Falls, Wisconsin. Founded in 1906 by William Irvine, it covers  including a zoo, started in 1909 as a bear pen, and museum.

References

External links

Protected areas of Chippewa County, Wisconsin
Parks in Wisconsin
Zoos in Wisconsin
Articles needing infobox zoo
1906 establishments in Wisconsin
Protected areas established in 1906
Zoos established in 1909